Rolf Strittmatter (born 26 July 1955) is a Swiss bobsledder who competed in the early 1980s. He won a gold medal in the four-man event at the 1983 FIBT World Championships in Lake Placid, New York. He competed as an athlete at the 1980 Summer Olympics in the men's 4 × 400 m relay.

References

External links
Bobsleigh four-man world championship medalists since 1930

1955 births
Living people
Swiss male bobsledders
Swiss male sprinters
Athletes (track and field) at the 1980 Summer Olympics
Bobsledders at the 1984 Winter Olympics
Olympic athletes of Switzerland
Olympic bobsledders of Switzerland
20th-century Swiss people